Chelis dahurica is a moth in the family Erebidae. It was described by Jean Baptiste Boisduval in 1832. It is found in Russia (southern Urals, south-western Siberia, Altai, Saur, Transbaikalia) and the Mongolian steppe.

The wingspan is about 40 mm.

References

Moths described in 1832
Arctiina